Serine/threonine-protein kinase 40 is an enzyme that in humans is encoded by the STK40 gene.

References

Further reading

EC 2.7.11